Beli Lukaj Muriqi (born 4 December 1999), also known as Beli Muriqi, is a Swiss footballer who plays as a midfielder for Moldovan club Zimbru Chișinău.

Career

Youth career
Muriqi started playing football for his hometown club, Aarau and was part of it until 31 August 2017, when he joined the youth academy of Italian Serie A side Lazio. His debut with Lazio's youth academy came on 13 January 2018 against Torino after being named in the starting line-up and scored his side's only goal during a 3–1 away defeat.

Skënderbeu Korçë
On 31 January 2020, Muriqi joined Kategoria Superiore side Skënderbeu Korçë. Twelve days later, he was named as a Skënderbeu Korçë substitute for the first time in 2019–20 Albanian Cup second round against Besa Kavajë. In addition to this match, Muriqi was eight times as a substitute, but without the possibility of debut.

Zimbru Chișinău
On 7 March 2022, Muriqi joined Moldovan National Division side Zimbru Chișinău and received squad number 20. On 3 April 2022, he made his debut in a 0–0 away draw against Dinamo-Auto after being named in the starting line-up.

Personal life
Muriqi was born in Aarau, Switzerland to Kosovo Albanian parents from Peja.

References

External links

1999 births
Living people
People from Aarau
Swiss people of Kosovan descent
Swiss people of Albanian descent
Sportspeople from Aargau
Swiss men's footballers
Kosovan footballers
Association football midfielders
Moldovan Super Liga players
KF Skënderbeu Korçë players
FC Zimbru Chișinău players
Swiss expatriate footballers
Kosovan expatriate footballers
Swiss expatriate sportspeople in Italy
Kosovan expatriate sportspeople in Italy
Expatriate footballers in Italy
Swiss expatriate sportspeople in Albania
Kosovan expatriate sportspeople in Albania
Expatriate footballers in Albania
Swiss expatriate sportspeople in Moldova
Kosovan expatriate sportspeople in Moldova
Expatriate footballers in Moldova